Sergio Martínez Ballesteros (born 4 September 1975) is a Spanish former professional footballer who played as a central defender.

He started and finished his 19-year professional career with Levante, amassing La Liga totals of 387 games and eight goals over 15 seasons. He also represented in the competition Tenerife (four years), Rayo Vallecano, Villarreal (three) and Mallorca (four).

Club career
Born in Burjassot, Valencian Community, Ballesteros came through the ranks of local Levante UD. In January 1996 he moved on loan to the Canary Islands' CD Tenerife, making his La Liga debut on 3 January in a 2–0 home win against Racing de Santander. After making the move permanent he went on to become an important defensive player, also starting to garner a reputation as a tough, sometimes to excess, central defender: in the 1998–99 season, as Tenerife ranked second-bottom, he was sent off twice in just eight appearances.

For the 2000–01 campaign, Ballesteros moved to Rayo Vallecano in Madrid, collecting ten yellow cards in his only season and playing all the games and minutes in the team's quarter-final run in the UEFA Cup. He subsequently spent three years at Villarreal CF, being an important defensive element as the club consolidated in the main division.

From 2004 to 2008, Ballesteros represented RCD Mallorca also in the top flight, receiving eight additional marching orders in 113 first-team appearances. In July 2008 the 33-year-old was deemed surplus to requirements and released, re-joining Levante, recently relegated to the Segunda División, after 13 years.

Veteran Ballesteros rarely missed a match for the Granotas the following seasons, playing 34 matches in 2010–11 (one goal, against CA Osasuna in a 2–1 home win) as the team finally retained their top-flight status. He fared even better the following campaign – also finding the net once, at Rayo Vallecano in a 2–1 victory– to help the side finish sixth and qualify for the Europa League for the first time ever.

Ballesteros was again a starter and team captain in 2012–13. However, late into the campaign, he, alongside Juanlu and Gustavo Munúa, was accused by teammate José Barkero of lack of commitment during a 0–4 home loss to Deportivo de La Coruña, which led to several match fixing allegations.

Honours
Villarreal
UEFA Intertoto Cup: 2003, 2004

Spain U21
UEFA European Under-21 Championship: 1998

References

External links

1975 births
Living people
People from Burjassot
Sportspeople from the Province of Valencia
Spanish footballers
Footballers from the Valencian Community
Association football defenders
La Liga players
Segunda División players
Segunda División B players
Levante UD footballers
CD Tenerife players
Rayo Vallecano players
Villarreal CF players
RCD Mallorca players
Spain under-21 international footballers
Spain under-23 international footballers